Peter Philpott (born 28 October 1967) is a former Bermudian cricketer. Philpott's batting and bowling styles are unknown.

Philpott made his debut for Bermuda in a List A match against Trinidad and Tobago during the 1998–99 Red Stripe Bowl, and made two further List A appearances in that tournament against the Windward Islands and  Guyana. The following season, he played a further three List A matches against Jamaica, Guyana and the Windward Islands. He took six wickets in his six List A matches, which came at an average of 26.00 and with best figures of 3/33. With the bat, he scored 11 runs with a high score of 5.

References

External links
Peter Philpott at ESPNcricinfo
Peter Philpott at CricketArchive

1967 births
Living people
Bermudian cricketers